Cody Lightning (born August 8, 1986) is a Cree actor from Edmonton, Alberta, Canada. He is the son of Georgina Lightning, and brother of William Lightning and Crystle Lightning.

He was a Young Artist Award nominee in 1999 for Best Performance in a Feature Film - Supporting Young Actor, for Smoke Signals (1998), and won the American Indian Film Festival award for Best Actor in 2007 for Four Sheets to the Wind.

Selected filmography

References

External links

1986 births
Living people
20th-century Canadian male actors
20th-century First Nations people
21st-century Canadian male actors
21st-century First Nations people
Canadian male film actors
First Nations male actors
Cree people
Male actors from Edmonton